Synanthedon leucogaster is a moth of the family Sesiidae. It is known from Gabon.

Taxonomy
Synanthedon leucogaster is the replacement name for Ichneumenoptera albiventris Le Cerf, 1917, secondary homonym of Sesia albiventris Beutenmüller, 1899.

References

Endemic fauna of Gabon
Sesiidae
Fauna of Gabon
Moths of Africa
Moths described in 1919